KFF Jakova is a women's football club based in Gjakova, Kosovo. The club competes in Kosovo Women's Football League which is the top tier of women's football in the country. Their home ground is the Gjakova City Stadium which has a seating capacity of 6,000.

See also
 List of football clubs in Kosovo

References

Football clubs in Kosovo
Women's football clubs in Kosovo